Clifford Frederick Hough (27 April 1913 – 9 May 2003) was an Australian rules footballer who played with North Melbourne in the Victorian Football League (VFL).

Notes

External links 

1913 births
2003 deaths
Australian rules footballers from Melbourne
North Melbourne Football Club players
People from Caulfield, Victoria